WBJU-FM and WBJU-TV are the radio and television stations located on the campus of Bob Jones University and licensed to Greenville, South Carolina. The stations exist primarily to provide Radio and Television majors experience in the media, but the studios are also used for other student productions and during the summer to teach high school students during Media Camp. Both the radio and TV stations have won numerous awards from various media organizations including NRB, BEA, and RTNDA.

WBJU-FM 
WBJU 104.5 FM is a campus radio station broadcasting from the Gustafson Fine Arts Building  on the campus of Bob Jones University in Greenville, South Carolina. Run mostly by students, the station is used as a tool to give students experience in the field of radio broadcasting, including news, weather, sports, talk, and music.
 Highlights of the radio station include White Glove broadcasts, intended to entertain residence hall students on the one day each semester when they are required to "white glove" their entire room, as well as a remote broadcast from the University Snack Shop following the Christmas Lighting Ceremony.

Special White Glove Broadcasts each semester

Christmas Lighting Ceremony Broadcast

(Various) Each year several students are given the opportunity to develop, write, produce, and air their own shows. All student radio shows are required to be done live giving them experience in announcing, editing, and board-"opping."

WBJU-TV 
WBJU-TV is the campus television station version of the radio station. WBJU TV was previously known as "WBJU TV 3" because it broadcast on "channel three," but the "3" has been dropped from the name. Students use the station to broadcast campus news, weather, and sports as well as other material produced by students and staff. Both the radio and television studios exist to help RTV students gain experience in their fields of study.

WBJU-TV News has in the past broadcast "live-to-tape" news which would be taped in the mornings and then aired throughout the day. However, starting in 2008 WBJU has been broadcasting all of its news live, mostly to prepare students for the five hour live presidential election broadcast. Faculty and Staff make it a point to create an educational atmosphere while not interfering in order to give students as much experience as possible. Therefore, faculty play more of an administrative roll, trying to interfere as little as possible, leaving the creative and production functions solely up to the students.

WBJU TV Programs

News: National News, Campus News, Weather, Sports, Interviews, and Editorials.

InFocus: A magazine/documentary show highlighting events, telling little known stories, providing talkback, and giving behind the scenes information.

Beyond the Front Gates: A show about great getaways off campus.

Collegiate Cooking: A 10-minute in-studio cooking show specializing in easy recipes for dorm kitchens.

Goal: Campus Soccer

Slam: Campus Basketball

Each year the upperclassmen radio & television broadcasting majors are each required to write and produce a "pilot program." These projects give students experience in what it takes to create a television show from scratch, pitch the idea, and produce and package it for television. This pilot program assignment is the birthplace of most of the regular programs on WBJU. Many others are grad projects that have continued after the students have graduated.

External links 
 Bob Jones University

Mass media companies established in the 1960s
BJU
Unlicensed radio stations in the United States
BJU